IPSC Australia Inc is the Australian association for practical shooting under the International Practical Shooting Confederation. It consists of seven sections: Victoria and Tasmania, South Australia, New South Wales, Australian Capital Territory, Queensland, Northern Territory and Western Australia.

See also 
IPSC Australian Handgun Championship
IPSC Australian Rifle Championship
IPSC Australian Shotgun Championship

References

External links 
 Official homepage of IPSC Australia Inc

Regions of the International Practical Shooting Confederation
Sports organisations of Australia